Mathurin Forestier (fl. c. 1500) was a French Renaissance composer.

Works
 Missa L'homme arme
 Missa Baises moy, after the song Baisez Moi attributed to Josquin
 Veni sancte spiritus, formerly attributed to Josquin

References

French composers
15th-century French composers
Year of birth unknown
Year of death unknown